Ormiston Denes Academy  is a secondary school with academy status located in the northern outskirts of Lowestoft in the English county of Suffolk. It has around 1000 students aged 11 to 16.

It is situated on Yarmouth Road, the A47. It is also home to a sports training centre open to the public.

History
Located in the historic parish of St Margaret's, the academy's history dates back to 1910 when it was founded as a replacement for a secondary fee-paying day school established in 1904.  Built by Brown and Kerr its main building is a Grade II Listed Building with a Queen Anne facade.  The school was originally designed to accommodate 320 pupils with the site comprising eleven acres of which seven were playing fields.  For the first nine years the school was called the Lowestoft Municipal Secondary School and its aim was to provide a ‘sound education for boys and girls between the ages of 10 and 18’.  In 1914, the first school magazine, The Lowestoftian was published, detailing the events of the school.  Although it has seen many changes over time The Lowestoftian continues to be published to this day.

From 1920 the school was renamed the Lowestoft Secondary School before becoming known as Lowestoft Grammar School from 1945 under the changes of the 1944 Butler Education Act. In June 1940, soon after the start of the Second World War and as a result of the danger from air raids on Lowestoft, 327 pupils together with the Head Master and 21 members of staff were evacuated to Worksop.  The return to Lowestoft commenced in 1943 with eventually all returning by July 1944. 
After the end of the war there was a population boom, which caused a rapid rise in the number of pupils attending the school.  This necessitated a utilitarian building programme in order to accommodate the new pupils.  This expansion of the school buildings continued intermittently for the next 30 years.

The school became a comprehensive in 1971 and was renamed The Denes High School. In September 2004 it was designated by the Department for Education and Skills as a specialist school as a Business and Enterprise College.

In September 2011 the school became an 11 to 16 school as part of the reorganisation of schools in Lowestoft by Suffolk County Council. Pupils in years 7 and 8 joined the school after the closure of eight middle schools in Lowestoft. The opening of Lowestoft Sixth Form College also meant that the school lost its role in the Lowestoft 6th consortium, which had operated as a shared sixth form between the high schools in the town.

As The Denes High School, it was rated as 'Inadequate' in all four criteria following an Ofsted inspection in September 2012 and was placed into special measures. The headteacher, Peter Marshall, who joined the school in October 2012, led the conversion to academy status in 2013 as part of the Ormiston Academies Trust and the school was renamed Ormiston Denes Academy. The school was taken out of special measures in March 2015 but saw little improvement in its examination results in 2016. On 5 September 2016, Peter Marshall left the school after resigning to "explore other career opportunities closer to home". He was replaced by Ben Driver as interim principal until January 2017, when Mr. Driver was appointed principal.

Notable alumni

The Denes High School
 James Mayhew, artist; author and illustrator of children's books
 Sean Harris, actor
 Prof Jules Pretty OBE, Professor of Environment and Society since 2000 at the University of Essex
 Karl Theobald, actor and comedian
 Zeb Soanes, BBC Radio 4 Newsreader, author and Television Presenter
 Daniel Cooper, journalist

Lowestoft Grammar School
 Reginald Allerton CBE, president from 1949–50 and 1960-61 of the Institute of Housing 
 Rosemary Ashe, actress/singer
 Prof Willy Aspinall CMG, Cabot Professor in Natural Hazards and Risk Science since 2009 at the University of Bristol
 Sir Brian Bailey OBE, chairman from 1980-93 of Television South West (TSW) and president from 1987 to 2004 of the Hospital Caterers Association 
 Maurice Baker, managing director from 1967-71 of Woolworths Ltd
 Dennis Barker, Guardian journalist 
 Keith Beckett FREng, Vice President Engineering from 1982-97 of Pilkington PLC 
 Prof John Bleby, vet
 Sir Tim Brighouse, Chief Adviser from 2003-07 for London Schools at the DfES 
 Terry Butcher, Ipswich and England footballer
 James Campbell, Professor of Medieval History from 1996-2002 at the University of Oxford 
 Claud Castleton VC
 John Edmonds CBE, Chief Executive from 1994-97 of Railtrack plc 
 Barry Hartop, Chief Executive from 1994-97 of the Welsh Development Agency
 James Hoseason OBE, built up the Hoseasons travel company
 Andrew Marshall, screenwriter, who wrote and created 2point4 Children, wrote Radio 4's 1970s The Burkiss Way (with David Renwick), and was Douglas Adams' inspiration for the character Marvin in The Hitchhiker's Guide to the Galaxy
 Maj-Gen John Milne CB, Colonel Commandant from 2001-07 of the Royal Artillery 
 Prof Brendan Neiland, artist
 Tony Palmer, film and theatre director
 David Porter, local Conservative MP from 1987-97 for Waveney 
 Eddie Spearritt, Ipswich Town footballer
 Jack Strowger CBE, managing director from 1970-79 of Thorn Electrical Industries  and chairman from 1981 to 1993 of Hornby Hobbies 
 Tony Wood, Vice-Chancellor from 1993-98 of the University of Luton, and director from 1985-93 of the Luton College of Higher Education
David Gage MBE DL ACIB Corporate Director NatWest Bank PLC from  1994-2000, Chair Stafford Railway Building Society from 2014-2017, Chair & Pro Chancellor Staffordshire University 2015 to 2019

References

External links
 Website of Ormiston Denes Academy
 
 EduBase

Secondary schools in Suffolk
Grade II listed buildings in Suffolk
Academies in Suffolk
Grade II listed educational buildings
Ormiston Academies